John Marshall Mendinhall (September 30, 1861 – October 14, 1938) was an American politician who served as the  third Lieutenant Governor of Delaware, from January 19, 1909, to January 21, 1913, under Governor Simeon S. Pennewill.

External links
 Delaware's Lieutenant Governors

Lieutenant Governors of Delaware
1861 births
1938 deaths